Brent Leroy Butt (born August 3, 1966) is a Canadian actor, comedian, and screenwriter. He is best known for his role as Brent Leroy on the CTV sitcom Corner Gas, which he created. He also created the television series Hiccups and wrote the 2013 film No Clue.

Early life and education
Born on August 3, 1966, in Tisdale, Saskatchewan, Butt attended Tisdale Unit Composite School. After graduating, Butt briefly attended Ontario's Sheridan College before returning to his home in Saskatchewan.

Career
While working as a drywaller, Butt and a friend started a publishing company, Windwolf Graphics. His comic, Existing Earth, was nominated for an Eagle Award. They published two issues before running out of money.

In February 1988, Butt performed stand-up comedy for the first time at an amateur night at a Saskatoon comedy club. He then began performing in the Yuk Yuk's chain in Western Canada, before moving to Toronto in 1989, where he lived in a Cabbagetown apartment with two other comedians, and performing at Yuk Yuk's there.

Butt presented stand-up performances for CTV, CBC Television, CBC Radio's Definitely Not the Opera, and The Comedy Network in Canada, as well as A&E in the United States and the Special Broadcasting Service in Australia. He composed a number of prairie-oriented funny and/or "folksy" songs, including "Nothing Rhymes with Saskatchewan" and "Hairy Legs".

In 2003, through his production company Prairie Pants, Butt co-created the CTV television series Corner Gas, set in his home province of Saskatchewan. He starred in the show from 2004 to 2009

On May 19, 2005, Butt hosted a Royal Command Performance gala for Queen Elizabeth II and Prince Philip, Duke of Edinburgh, held in Saskatoon, Saskatchewan, to celebrate the Canadian province's centennial. He performed his song "Nothing Rhymes with Saskatchewan" and traded jokes with Leslie Nielsen. That year, he also hosted the Juno Awards.

In 2008, Butt and Prairie Pants made the decision to end Corner Gas after its sixth season, which aired during the 2008–2009 season.

At the World Television Festival in Banff, Alberta, Butt was given the Comedy Network Sir Peter Ustinov Award which is presented in recognition of a significant body of comedic work. Past recipients include John Cleese, Bob Newhart, John Candy, and Eugene Levy.

Butt also wrote and produced a comedy series for CTV, from 2010 to 2011, entitled Hiccups. The series starred Nancy Robertson as Millie Upton, a children's author who begins seeing a life coach to deal with her anger management issues.

On July 25, 2010, Butt had a one-hour comedy special titled The Brent Butt Comedy Special. It was shown on The Comedy Network. Guest stars were Seth Rogen, Dave Foley, and Jully Black.

In 2014, Butt co-wrote and co-executive produced the film, Corner Gas: The Movie, which was released in theatres and on CTV on December that year. He also reprised the role of Brent LeRoy. The film included cameo appearances by several Canadian TV personalities as well as Academy Award nominee Graham Greene and Will Sasso.

In April 2018, Brent's follow-up series Corner Gas Animated premiered on The Comedy Network.

Personal life
Butt is married to his Corner Gas and Hiccups co-star Nancy Robertson. The two have been married since 2005.

Awards and nominations
Butt has won four Canadian Comedy Awards, for Best Male Stand-up (2001), Best Male TV Performance (Corner Gas, 2004–05), and Best Writing – TV Series (Corner Gas, 2004). The Comedy Network Sir Peter Ustinov Award was awarded to Butt at the Banff World Television Festival in 2008.

Filmography

References

External links
 
 Brent Butt on ComedyNightLife.com
 
 Brent Butt article in Canadian Encyclopedia
 Brent Butt entry in Encyclopedia of Saskatchewan
 Brent Butt as guest on comedy podcast Stop Podcasting Yourself

1966 births
20th-century Canadian comedians
21st-century Canadian comedians
Canadian male comedians
Canadian male film actors
Canadian male television actors
Canadian male voice actors
Canadian stand-up comedians
Living people
Male actors from Saskatchewan
Male actors from Vancouver
People from Tisdale, Saskatchewan
Sheridan College alumni
Comedians from Saskatchewan
Comedians from Vancouver
Canadian Comedy Award winners
Television show creators